In Conversation, previously known as Conversation With (CW) from 1999 to 2018, is a Singapore television programme broadcast on Asian news network CNA. The show has been on the air for 22 years and was twice nominated for Best Talk Show at the Asian Television Awards. Notable guests on the interview show include former US President Barack Obama and Nobel Peace Prize recipient Aung San Suu Kyi.

History 
CW, originally titled In Conversation, debuted on 28 April 1996. The show initially aired on Singapore domestic television, on Singapore's English-language station Mediacorp Channel 5 and was produced by the then Television Corporation of Singapore, which was renamed Mediacorp TV in February 2001.

CW began airing on CNA when the network was launched on 1 March 1999, and would later find an international audience when CNA began broadcasting regionally in September 2000. The show is today available in 28 territories, according to CNA, where the network is currently available. The program was reverted to its former name on 26 April 2019.

Format 
Since its debut, CW has been a personality profile conducted through one-on-one interviews in episodes of 25 minutes duration. The show has a broad focus with celebrities such as Jackie Chan having been featured, although subjects are mostly political and business figures.

The first subject on CW was Singapore's then Economic Development Board CEO Philip Yeo, with former US Secretary of State James Baker featuring in the second episode.

In 2016, CW secured an exclusive interview with then US president Barack Obama on the sidelines of the US-ASEAN summit in Sunnylands, California.

The programme currently broadcasts on Thursday evenings, with a different telecast timing for India. Previous episodes are also available on the CNA website's Conversation With catch-up page.

Notable guests 
 Former US president Barack Obama
 Aung San Suu Kyi, 1991 Nobel Peace Prize recipient and 1st State Counsellor of Myanmar
 Former International Monetary Fund Managing Director Christine Lagarde
 Uniqlo president and founder Tadashi Yanai
 Tata Group chairman Ratan Tata
 Airbnb co-founder and Chief Technology Officer Nathan Blecharczyk
 Actor Jackie Chan
 Actress Michelle Yeoh
 Oscar-winning actor Robert De Niro

References

External links
 Conversation With catch-up page
 Channel NewsAsia website

1996 Singaporean television series debuts
Singaporean television news shows
Channel 5 (Singapore) original programming
CNA (TV network) original programming